The Lithuanian A Lyga 2003 was the 14th season of top-tier football in Lithuania. The season started on 4 April 2003 and ended on 31 October 2003. 8 teams participated with FBK Kaunas winning the championship.

League standings

Results

First half of season

Second half of season

See also 
 2003 LFF Lyga

References 

LFF Lyga seasons
1
Lith
Lith